Dichomeris siren, the least dichomeris moth, is a moth in the family Gelechiidae. It was described by Ronald W. Hodges in 1986. It is found in the United States, where it has been recorded from Maryland, Connecticut, Indiana, Michigan, New Jersey, Virginia, South Carolina, Tennessee and Georgia.

The length of the forewings is 3.1-3.8 mm. The forewings are brown with a continuous yellowish-orange strip that starts at about two-thirds and runs along the costa, diagonally to the inner margin, angling back to the costa and then to the base. The terminal area is yellowish orange with a line of brown spots, and there is a yellowish-orange patch along the inner margin near the base. The hindwings are grayish brown. Adults are on wing from May to October.

References

Moths described in 1986
siren